Roy Lester is an English former professional rugby league footballer and coach. He later coached Fulham and Carlisle, and was also assistant coach at Warrington before the advent of Super League.

Playing career
Lester was an unused sub in the 1971 Challenge Cup Final where Leigh beat Leeds 24–7 at Wembley Stadium in front of a crowd of 85,514.

Lester was newly founded Fulham's first signing, when he signed on a free transfer from Warrington in 1980.

Post playing career
In 2019 he was inducted into the London Broncos Hall of Fame.

References

External links
LBSA profile
Leigh Heritage Numbers
Warrington Heritage Numbers

Living people
Carlisle RLFC coaches
English rugby league players
Leigh Leopards players
London Broncos coaches
London Broncos players
Rugby league players from Warrington
Rugby league props
Warrington Wolves players
Year of birth missing (living people)